Juan Alberto Flores Maradiaga (born 8 March 1964) is a Honduran former football player.

Career statistics

Club

Notes

International

International goals
Scores and results list Honduras' goal tally first.

References

1964 births
Living people
Honduran footballers
Honduran expatriate footballers
Honduras international footballers
Association football forwards
Honduran football managers
C.D. Olimpia players
Santos Laguna footballers
Honduran expatriate sportspeople in Mexico
Expatriate footballers in Mexico
Liga MX players